The Pallas-class frigates were a series of three frigates  built to a 1791 design by John Henslow, which served in the Royal Navy during the French Revolutionary and Napoleonic Wars.

The trio were all dockyard-built in order to use spare shipbuilding capacity. The orders were originally assigned in December 1790 to the Royal Dockyards at Plymouth and Portsmouth, but in February 1791 the orders were transferred to Chatham and Woolwich Dockyards respectively. They were the first and only 32-gun Royal Navy frigates designed to be armed with the eighteen-pounder cannon on their upper deck, the main gun deck of a frigate.

Ships in class 

 Builder:  Chatham Royal Dockyard
 Ordered:   9 December 1790
 Laid down:  March 1792
 Launched:  12 July 1794
 Completed: 5 October 1794
 Fate:  Wrecked in a storm in Vigo Bay 6 September 1800, and burnt the next day.

 Builder:  Chatham Royal Dockyard
 Ordered:   9 December 1790
 Laid down:  March 1792
 Launched:  12 July 1794
 Completed: 5 October 1794
 Fate:  Broken up March 1815 at Deptford Dockyard.

 Builder:  Woolwich Royal Dockyard
 Ordered: 9 December 1790
 Laid down:  May 1792
 Launched:  19 December 1793
 Completed: 5 March 1794.
 Fate:  Wrecked in a storm in Cawsand Bay, Cornwall on 4 April 1798

References

Robert Gardiner, The Heavy Frigate, Conway Maritime Press, London 1994.

Rif Winfield, British Warships in the Age of Sail 1793-1817: Design, Construction, Careers and Fates. 2nd edition, Seaforth Publishing, 2008. .

External links
 

Frigate classes
Frigates of the Royal Navy
 
Ship classes of the Royal Navy